The Switzerland women's national artistic gymnastics team represents Switzerland in FIG international competitions.

History
Switzerland has participated in the Olympic Games women's team competition two times, in 1972 and 1984.

Senior roster

Most decorated gymnasts
This list includes all Swiss female artistic gymnasts who have won a medal at the Olympic Games or the World Artistic Gymnastics Championships.

See also 
 List of Olympic female artistic gymnasts for Switzerland

References

Gymnastics in Switzerland
National women's artistic gymnastics teams
Gym